Dovid Gottlieb (born Dale Victor Gottlieb)  is a senior faculty member at Ohr Somayach in Jerusalem. An author and lecturer, Rabbi Gottlieb received his Ph.D. in mathematical logic at Brandeis University and later become (visiting) Associate Professor of Philosophy at Johns Hopkins University. A student of Jean Van Heijenoort, he received a doctorate in 1970 for his thesis The Use of Formal Systems in Logic and Mathematics. The Informed Soul was published by Artscroll in 1990, and has recently been reprinted.

Personal
Rabbi Gottlieb was married to Rebbitzen Leeba Gottlieb, who died in January 2020. He married Rebbetzin Tziporah Heller on May 12, 2020.
His brother is Roger S. Gottlieb, a professor of philosophy and researcher in Spiritual ecology at Worcester Polytechnic Institute.

Books
Ontological Economy: Substitutional Quantification and Mathematics, OUP, 1980
The Informed Soul, Artscroll/Mesorah, 1990
Reason to Believe , Mosaica Press, 2017

References

External links
Rabbi Gottlieb's homepage

Haredi rabbis in Israel
Living people
Rabbis of Ohr Somayach
Year of birth missing (living people)
Johns Hopkins University faculty
Brandeis University alumni
Baalei teshuva
Jewish apologists